"What Goes On" is a song by the English rock band the Beatles, featured as the eighth track on their 1965 album Rubber Soul. The song was later released as the B-side of the US single "Nowhere Man", and then as the tenth track on the North America-only album Yesterday and Today. It is the only song by the band credited to Lennon–McCartney–Starkey and the only song on Rubber Soul that features Ringo Starr on lead vocals. The song reached number 81 on the US Billboard Hot 100 in 1966.

Composition
John Lennon wrote the song in early 1959, likely at 251 Menlove Avenue. The early version of the song is heavily inspired by Buddy Holly and differed substantially from the Rubber Soul version with only the chorus being the same.

The Beatles nearly recorded the song in March 1963, but ultimately did not record the song until November 1965 for Rubber Soul. According to Lennon, "it was resurrected with a middle eight thrown in, probably with Paul [McCartney]'s help". Barry Miles also claimed that McCartney and Starr combined for the middle eight. There is no formal middle eight in the song, although one chorus and one verse are extended; Musicologist and writer Ian MacDonald believes those longer sections were written by McCartney. Starr contributed to the lyrics, his first-ever composing credit on a Beatles song. When asked what his contribution was, Starr jokingly responded, "[I wrote] about five words to 'What Goes On' and I haven't done a thing since." MacDonald and musicologist Walter Everett write that Starr's contribution was the lyric "Waiting for the tides of time". MacDonald calls these lines, "pseudo-Dylanesque". The first pressing of the single accidentally omitted "Starkey" in the songwriting credit.

Recording

"From Me to You" session, 1963
On 5 March 1963, during a session for "From Me To You" and "Thank You Girl", the Beatles wanted to record "What Goes On" and "One After 909" (then titled "The One After 909"). With only enough time remaining to record one more song, they opted for "The One After 909". Lennon and Paul McCartney recorded a demo of this version in 1963, but the song was not used until 1965 as Ringo Starr's vocal piece for Rubber Soul.

Rubber Soul sessions, 1965

Neil Aspinall recalls that McCartney made a multitrack home demo of the song in 1965: "When Paul wanted to show Ringo how 'What Goes On' sounded he made up a multi-track tape. Onto this went Paul singing, Paul playing lead guitar, Paul playing bass and Paul playing drums. Then Ringo listened to the finished tape and added his own ideas before the recording session."
 
The Rubber Soul version was recorded in one take, with overdubs, during a late-night session on 4 November 1965. George Martin produced, supported by engineers Norman Smith, Ken Scott and Graham Platt. Everett writes that Lennon's guitar part is in the style of Steve Cropper and his "Memphis 'chick' rhythm part." He adds that George Harrison includes "rockabilly string crossings, double-stops, and portamento neighbors." Starr likely recorded a guide vocal on the basic track, wiped over by his final vocal overdub. The original guide vocal can be heard through the drum mike during Starr's solo and during the coda. As well, during the verse before the lead break after Starr sings "tell me why," Lennon says, "We already told you why!", in reference to the Beatles' "Tell Me Why" from A Hard Day's Night.

Martin, assisted by Smith and Jerry Boys, mixed the song for mono and stereo on 9 November 1965.  Harrison's Gretsch Tennessean guitar is muted during the last two bars of the mono mix. Everett suggests this likely happened because the engineer meant to mute the vocal track but forgot that Harrison's guitar was on that track as well.

Release and reception
The Beatles released "What Goes On" in both mono and stereo in the U.K. on the 3 December 1965 release Rubber Soul. Capitol released the song as the B-side to the U.S. only single "Nowhere Man" on 21 February 1966. Despite being the B-side, the song entered the Billboard Hot 100 for two weeks, reaching #81. Capitol pulled the track from the North American release of Rubber Soul and instead included it on the North American-only album Yesterday and Today, released 20 June 1966. 

Critics have generally been unfavourable towards the song when comparing it with the others on Rubber Soul. Beatles writer Kenneth Womack asserts that the song is "quite arguably the weakest and most incongruous track on the album." Professor of English and writer James M. Decker writes the song represents, "a retrograde achievement lyrically," then adds, "Lyrically formulaic and musically plain (though perhaps the 'country' feel is offered as an arch parody of the lyrics), 'What Goes On' anchors the Beatles in the very tradition that they are exploding during many other moments on Rubber Soul." MacDonald writes the song "has the same sloppy country-and-western ambience as "Act Naturally". For AllMusic, Richie Unterberger  writes the song is an "enjoyable if lightweight" country & western-flavoured entry in the Beatles catalogue. He praises Harrison's guitar work, which "again marks him as the finest disciple of Carl Perkins." Everett describes McCartney's bass as "soulful." He further writes that after "What Goes On", the Beatles rockabilly style went "into dormancy".

Cover versions
Sufjan Stevens recorded a cover of the song in 2005 for the compilation album, This Bird Has Flown – A 40th Anniversary Tribute to the Beatles' Rubber Soul. In a review for Pitchfork, Rob Mitchum writes that Stevens takes Starr's "abysmal country tune" and turns it into, "a really good Sufjan Stevens song, arranged for the full Illinoisemaker band with choral interludes, diving strings, and a surprisingly gritty jam." Barry Walters of Rolling Stone magazine writes, "Changing chords, rewriting melody, overhauling rhythms and resequencing large chunks of lyrics, the ever-ambitious Sufjan Stevens turns 'What Goes On' inside out with an intricate stop-and-start arrangement that affirms Rubber Soul's elastic strength." Stephen Thomas Erlewine of AllMusic was less favourable, describing Stevens track as, "the only severe misstep in an album filled with good, generally pleasant covers."

Personnel
According to Ian MacDonald:
Ringo Starr vocal, drums
John Lennon harmony vocal, rhythm guitar
Paul McCartney harmony vocal, bass guitar
George Harrison lead guitar

Charts

Weekly charts

References

Citations

Sources

External links 
 
 

1966 singles
The Beatles songs
Song recordings produced by George Martin
Songs written by Lennon–McCartney
Songs written by Ringo Starr
Capitol Records singles
Songs published by Northern Songs
1965 songs
Rockabilly songs